The 2007 Top League Challenge Series was the 2007 edition of the Top League Challenge Series, a second-tier rugby union competition in Japan, in which teams from regionalised leagues competed for promotion to the Top League for the 2007–08 season. The competition was contested from 14 to 27 January 2007.

Kyuden Voltex and Mitsubishi Sagamihara DynaBoars won promotion to the 2007–08 Top League, while Honda Heat and Kintetsu Liners progressed to the promotion play-offs.

Competition rules and information

The top two teams from the regional Top East League, Top West League and Top Kyūshū League qualified to the Top League Challenge Series. The regional league winners participated in Challenge 1, while the runners-up participated in Challenge 2.

The top two teams in Challenge 1 won automatic promotion to the 2007–08 Top League, while the third-placed team in Challenge 1 and the Challenge 2 winner qualified to the promotion play-offs.

Qualification

The teams qualified to the Challenge 1 and Challenge 2 series through the 2006 regional leagues.

Top West League

The final standings for the 2006 Top West League were:

 Kintetsu Liners qualified for Challenge 1.
 Honda Heat qualified for Challenge 2.
 Zentsuji SDF RFC, Mitsubishi Red Evolutions and Unitika Phoenix were all relegated to lower leagues.

Top East League

The final standings for the 2006 Top East League were:

 Mitsubishi Sagamihara DynaBoars qualified for Challenge 1.
 Tokyo Gas qualified for Challenge 2 after a play-off match against NTT Communications Shining Arcs.

The following match was played:

Top Kyūshū League

The final standings for the 2006 Top Kyūshū League were:

 Chugoku Electric Power, Kyuden Voltex and Mazda Blue Zoomers qualified to the Second Phase.

 Kyuden Voltex qualified for Challenge 1.
 Mazda Blue Zoomers qualified for Challenge 2.

Challenge 1

Standings

The final standings for the 2007 Top League Challenge 1 were:

 Kyuden Voltex and Mitsubishi Sagamihara DynaBoars won promotion to the 2007–08 Top League.
 Kintetsu Liners progressed to the promotion play-offs.

Matches

The following matches were played in the 2007 Top League Challenge 1:

Challenge 2

Standings

The final standings for the 2007 Top League Challenge 2 were:

 Honda Heat progressed to the promotion play-offs.

Matches

The following matches were played in the 2006 Top League Challenge 2:

See also

 2006–07 Top League
 Top League Challenge Series

References

2006 Challenge
2006–07 in Japanese rugby union
2006 rugby union tournaments for clubs